Dívčí Hrad is a municipality and village in Bruntál District in the Moravian-Silesian Region of the Czech Republic. It has about 300 inhabitants.

Geography
Dívčí Hrad is situated in the Osoblažsko microregion on the border with Poland. It lies in the Zlatohorská Highlands.

The Osoblaha River flows across the municipality. There are two ponds in the municipal territory, called Dívčí Hrad and Pitárno.

History
The first written mention of Dívčí Hrad is in the will of Bishop Bruno von Schauenburg from 1267, when the local castle was called Deuviz.

In 1474, the castle was conquered and destroyed by the army of Matthias Corvinus. Around 1573, a new Renaissance castle was built by Hynek Bruntálský of Vrbno on the site of the castle ruin. In 1580, Dívčí Hrad was bought by the Sedlnický of Choltice family, and after it was confiscated from them in 1622, it was acquired by the Teutonic Order. In 1768, Dívčí Hrad was acquired by the Knights Hospitaller, who owned the castle until the 20th century.

From 1976 to 1990, Dívčí Hrad was an administrative part of Osoblaha. Since 1990, it has been a separate municipality.

Transport
Dívčí Hrad is served by the Dívčí Hrad stop on the narrow-gauge Třemešná ve Slezsku – Osoblaha Railway, but the stop is located just outside the municipal territory.

Sights
The main landmark is the Dívčí Hrad Castle. This Renaissance castle is architecturally related to northern Italian churches with elements of fortress architecture. The castle was severely damaged during the World War II and then reconstructed.

Oblík Natural Monument consists of a rocky hill with statigraphic and paleontological significance. There are fossils of crinoids, corals, cephalopods and brachiopods from the Cretaceous.

References

External links

Villages in Bruntál District